Alpine Avalanche is  a weekly newspaper based in Alpine, Texas and covering Brewster County.

It has local news stories and advertisements, and it has almost no coverage of news outside of the area. In 1982 its circulation was 4,850 with vendor/counter/dealer sales being 2,196.

References

Weekly newspapers published in Texas
Brewster County, Texas
1891 establishments in Texas